John Hesilden was the member of Parliament for Great Grimsby in 1391. He was a trader in the local speciality of cured herring.

References 

Members of the Parliament of England for Great Grimsby
Year of birth missing
Year of death missing
English businesspeople
English MPs 1391